Dhalinyaro (Youth) is a 2017 Djiboutian drama film directed by Lula Ali Ismaïl where she became the first Djiboutian film director. It is co-produced by director herself with Alexandra Ramniceanu, Jean-Frédéric Samie and Gilles Sandoz for Samawada Films. The film stars Amina Mohamed Ali, Tousmo Mouhoumed Mohamed, and Bilan Samir Moubus in main roles. It is the first feature film in Djibouti cinema history which had its premiere in July 2017.

The film follows three young women from different socio-economic backgrounds. It was supported by the Organisation internationale de la Francophonie, and was co-produced in Canada, Somalia, France and Djibouti. It was filmed entirety in Djibouti. The film received critical acclaim and won several awards at international film festivals.

Cast
 Amina Mohamed Ali as Deka
 Tousmo Mouhoumed Mohamed as Asma
 Bilan Samir Moubus as Hibo

References

External links
 
 Dhalinyaro in YouTube

2017 films
Djiboutian films
2017 drama films